This is an order of battle listing the British and Commonwealth forces involved in the Indonesia-Malaysia confrontation (1962–66).

Commonwealth order of battle
The following units served in North Borneo, Sarawak or Brunei between 24 December 1962 and 11 August 1966, the eligible dates for the 1962 General Service Medal with clasp BORNEO.  Those marked * were based in UK.  The conditions for the BORNEO clasp were 30 days service ashore in Brunei, Sabah or Sarawak or afloat in coastal waters or one operational flying sortie in support of operations ashore.  In addition the MALAY PENINSULA clasp was awarded for 30 days service ashore in the Malay Peninsula or Singapore or afloat in their waters or carrying out 30 air patrols over the land area between 17 August 1964 and 11 August 1966.

In addition to the units listed below, between 1963 and 1966 there were up to 80 ships from the Royal Navy, Royal Australian Navy, Royal Malay Navy and Royal New Zealand Navy. Most of these were patrol craft, minesweepers, frigates and destroyers patrolling the coast-line to intercept Indonesian insurgents. One of the two Commando Carriers, HMS Albion and HMS Bulwark, was also committed throughout the period of Confrontation usually in their transport role for troops, helicopters and army aircraft between Singapore and Borneo.

An indication of relative effort is 'infantry battalion months' for the last 12 months of the war in Sarawak and Sabah. Of the 144 such months 36 were Malaysian, 48 Gurkha, 52 British, 4 Australian and 4 New Zealand.

United Kingdom 
 Royal Navy
 HMS Woolaston M1194
 HMS Triumph A108
 HMS Albion
 HMS Bulwark
 HMS Victorious
 HMS Centaur
 ((HMS Chichester (F59)(HMS Chichester)
 HMS Eagle
 HMS Kent
 HMS Hampshire
 HMS Cavendish
 HMS Caesar
 HMS Cambrian (D85)
 HMS Berwick
 HMS Dido
 HMS Fiskerton
 HMS Maryton
 PLUS: 17 other Destroyers and Frigates, twelve Minesweepers and five Submarines.
 40 Commando Royal Marines stationed at HMS Sembawang, Singapore
 42 Commando Royal Marines stationed at HMS Sembawang
 Sections of Special Boat Service
 Detachments of 845 Naval Air Squadron (Wessex) stationed at HMS Simbang, Singapore
 Detachments of 846 Naval Air Squadron (Whirlwind) stationed at HMS Simbang
 Detachments of 848 Naval Air Squadron (Wessex) stationed at HMS Simbang
 849 NAS Fairey Gannet AEW on HMS Victorious
 British Army
 Squadron of Life Guards
 Squadrons of 1st The Queen's Dragoon Guards*
 Squadrons of Queen's Royal Irish Hussars
 Squadrons of 4th Royal Tank Regiment
 H Squadron of 5th Royal Tank Regiment*
 4th Light Regiment Royal Artillery (comprising 29 (Corunna), 88 (Arracan) Battery Royal Artillery, 97 Battery (Lawson's Company) Royal Artillery Light Batteries)*
 V Light, 132 (Bengal Rocket Troop) Medium Batteries (of 6th Light Regiment Royal Artillery)
 T (Shah Sujah's Troop) and 9 (Plassey) Light Air Defence Batteries (of 12th Light Air Defence Regiment)
 30 Light Anti Defence Battery (Roger's Company) (of 16th Light Air Defence Regiment)*
 53 (Louisburg) Light Anti Aircraft Battery (now 53 (Louisburg) Battery RA of 22nd Light Air Defence Regiment* (disbanded 2004))
 11 (Sphinx) Light Anti Defence Battery (of 34th Light Air Defence Regiment)*
 40th Light Regiment Royal Artillery (comprising 38 (Seringapatum), 129 (Dragon), 137 (Java) Light Batteries)*
 70 Light, 176 (Abu Klea) Light, 170 (Imjin) Medium Batteries (of 45th Field Regiment Royal Artillery)
 8 (Alma), 7 (Sphinx), 79 (Kirkee), 145 (Maiwand), Commando Light Batteries (of 29th and 95th Commando Light Regiments, Royal Artillery)
 1st Battalion, Scots Guards
 Guards Independent Parachute Company
 1st Battalion, King's Own Scottish Borderers*
 1st Battalion, Gordon Highlanders*
 1st Battalion, Royal Ulster Rifles*
 1st Battalion, Queen's Own Highlanders
 1st Battalion, Queen's Own Buffs, The Royal Kent Regiment
 1st Battalion, Durham Light Infantry
 1st Battalion, Argyll and Sutherland Highlanders
 1st Battalion, Royal Leicestershire Regiment
 1st Battalion, King's Own Yorkshire Light Infantry
 1st Green Jackets (43rd and 52nd)
 2nd Green Jackets, The King's Royal Rifle Corps
 3rd Green Jackets, The Rifle Brigade
 2nd Battalion, The Parachute Regiment*
 D Company, 3rd Battalion, The Parachute Regiment*
 1st Battalion, Royal Hampshire Regiment*
 22 Special Air Service Regiment*
 1st and 2nd Battalions of 2nd Gurkha Rifles
 1st and 2nd Battalions, 6th Gurkha Rifles;
 1st and 2nd Battalions, 7th Gurkha Rifles;
 1st and 2nd Battalions, 10th Gurkha Rifles;
 Gurkha Independent Parachute Company
 Detachments 656 Squadron Army Air Corps
 various units from Corps of Royal Engineers
 various units from the Royal Corps of Signals
 Royal Air Force
 Detachments 15 Squadron RAF Regiment
 Detachments 26 Squadron LAA. RAF Regiment stationed at RAF Changi, Singapore
 Detachments 34 Squadron (Beverley) stationed at RAF Changi
 Detachments 48 Squadron (Hastings and Beverley) stationed at RAF Changi
 Detachments 209 Squadron (Pioneer and Twin Pioneer) stationed at RAF Seletar, Singapore
 Detachments 52 Squadron (Valletta) stationed at RAAF Butterworth, Malaya
 Detachments 66 Squadron (Belvedere) stationed at RAF Seletar
 Detachments 103 Squadron (Westland Whirlwind HC 10) stationed at RAF Seletar
 Detachments 110 Squadron (Westland Sycamore then Whirlwind) stationed at RAF Seletar
 Detachments 205 Squadron (AVRO Shackleton MR Mk2) stationed at RAF Changi
 225 Squadron (Westland Whirlwind HC 2)* stationed at RAF Seletar
 230 Squadron (Westland Whirlwind HC 10)* stationed at RAF Seletar
 81 Squadron (Canberra PR 9) stationed at RAF Tengah, Singapore
 20 Squadron (Hawker Hunter) stationed at RAF Tengah
 60 Squadron (Gloster Javelin) stationed at RAF Tengah
 64 Squadron (Gloster Javelin) stationed at RAF Tengah
 45 Squadron (Canberra) stationed at RAF Tengah

 15 Squadron Handley Page Victor stationed in at RAF Tengah and RAAF Butterworth
 215 Squadron Armstrong Whitworth AW.660 Argosy stationed at RAF Changi
 129 Signals Unit Radars Type 13, 14 and 15

Australia 
 Australian Army
3rd Battalion, Royal Australian Regiment
 4th Battalion, Royal Australian Regiment
 1 and 2 Squadrons of the Special Air Service Regiment
 102nd Field Battery, Royal Australian Artillery
 111th Light Anti-Aircraft Battery (Butterworth)
 110th Light Anti-Aircraft Battery - relieving Battery from May/June 1966
 1st Field Squadron, Royal Australian Engineers
 7th Field Squadron, Royal Australian Engineers
 21st Construction Squadron, Royal Australian Engineers
 22nd Construction Squadron, Royal Australian Engineers
 24th Construction Squadron, Royal Australian Engineers
2nd Field Troop, Royal Australian Engineers
 Royal Australian Air Force
 No. 2 Squadron RAAF (GAF Canberras)
 No. 3 Squadron RAAF (CAC Sabres)
 No. 5 Squadron RAAF (UH-1 Iroquois helicopters)
 No. 77 Squadron RAAF (CAC Sabres at Butterworth and then Changi, covering daylight operations)
 Royal Australian Navy
 HMAS Curlew
 HMAS Gull
 HMAS Hawk
 HMAS Ibis
 HMAS Snipe
 HMAS Teal
 HMAS Duchess
 HMAS Vampire
 HMAS Vendetta
 HMAS Derwent
 HMAS Parramatta
 HMAS Yarra

Malaysia 
 Malaysian Army
 Squadron of Malaysian Reconnaissance Regiment
 A and B Batteries (of 1st Regiment, Malaysian Artillery)
 3rd Battalion, Royal Malay Regiment
 5th Battalion, Royal Malay Regiment
 8th Battalion, Royal Malay Regiment
 1st Battalion, Singapore Infantry Regiment
 2nd Battalion, Singapore Infantry Regiment
 1st Battalion, Malaysian Rangers
 2nd battalion, Malaysian Rangers
 Royal Malaysian Navy
 KD Sri Perak
 KD Sri Perlis
 KD Sri Selangor (K3139)
 KD Hang Tuah (K433)
 Royal Malaysian Air Force
 Squadron (Alouette III)
 Squadron (Twin Pioneer)
 Royal Federation of Malayan Police
 Police Special Branch
 Battalion of Police Field Force
 Marine Police Force

New Zealand 
 New Zealand Army
 1st Battalion, Royal New Zealand Infantry Regiment
 1st Ranger Squadron
 Royal New Zealand Air Force
 No. 14 Squadron RNZAF (Canberra B(I)12) based RAF Tengah (1964–66) with deployments to RAF Labuan (1964), RAAF Butterworth (1965), RAF Gong Kedah (1965)
 No. 41 Squadron RNZAF (Bristol Freighter) based RAF Changi with detachments to RAF Kuching throughout the period of Confrontation
 Royal New Zealand Navy
 HMNZS Royalist
 HMNZS Otago
 HMNZS Taranaki
 HMNZS Hickleton
 HMNZS Santon
 HMNZS Blackpool

Notes

References

 
 

Indonesia–Malaysia confrontation
Orders of battle